Santa Barbara Island (Spanish: Isla de Santa Bárbara; Tongva: Tchunashngna) is a small island of the Channel Islands archipelago in Southern California. It is protected within Channel Islands National Park, and its marine ecosystem is part of the Channel Islands National Marine Sanctuary.

Geography

With a total area of about 1 square mile, it is the smallest of the eight Channel Islands. It is the southernmost island in the Channel Islands National Park.

Although closer to mainland Ventura County and Los Angeles County, the island is part of Santa Barbara County (United States Census Bureau Block 3012, Block Group 3, Census Tract 29.10). It is the only one of the four southern Channel Islands included in the Channel Islands National Park, which also encompasses all four northern islands.

Since it is so small it cannot usually be seen from the mainland, except on clear days (usually in winter) and at sunset when the island is a backlit silhouette.

Geology 
While the island is not a volcano, it is composed primarily of Miocene volcanic rocks (basalt) interbedded with marine sediments.

The steep wave-cut cliffs of its shoreline indicate that this is one of the younger Channel Islands. It exhibits at least six marine terraces; evidence of repeated tectonic uplift and subsidence (so called porpoising). Arch Point, on the north-east shore of the island is a  arch caused by wave erosion of fault weakened rock.

Offshore, there are two named rocks: Sutil Island off the southwest end and Shag Rock off the northerly shore .

History
Native American peoples, probably the Chumash and Tongva, occupied Santa Barbara Island periodically for millennia. Archaeological sites dating to as much as 4,000 years ago have been documented on the island, which may have served as a stopover or refuge point for voyagers between the mainland and the other Channel Islands.

The island was named by Spanish explorer Sebastián Vizcaíno, who sighted the island on 4 December 1602, the feast day dedicated to Saint Barbara.  The U.S. National Geodetic Survey surveyed the island in the 1850s. Squatting fishermen and seal hunters occupied the island, including H. Bay Webster near Webster Point, until the federal government leased the island to J.G. Howland in July 1909 for a period of five years. Alvin Hyder assumed the next five-year lease. From 1916 onwards, the island was occupied by the Hyder brothers, Alvin, Clarence and Cleve, with their families. They raised sheep until departing the island in 1922. The only other individuals to lease the island, before it became part of the national monument in 1938, were by Arthur McLelland and Harry Cupit from 1929 to 1932.

In 1852, Charles Melville Scammon, in the brig Mary Helen, hunted northern elephant seals and sea lions on Santa Barbara Island. In December 1934, the steam-schooner California spent a week anchored off the island, processing blue, fin, and sperm whales caught by her two steam-driven whale catchers Hawk and Port Saunders.

The United States Lighthouse Board erected a beacon on the northwest side of the island in 1928, followed by the addition of a second beacon on the southwest corner in 1934. The United States Coast Guard took over servicing, and replaced the northwest tower with a steel tower, solar-powered, in 1980. From 1942 until 1946, the United States Navy built a Coastal Lookout Station on the island, and in the 1960s they built a photo-tracking station, but had left the island by the mid-1960s.

Natural history

Fauna
Santa Barbara Island is home to a large sea lion rookery and seabird nesting colonies. It is also home to the largest breeding colony for Scripps's murrelet, a threatened seabird species. Scripps's murrelet is listed as vulnerable because so much of its breeding takes place on such a small and isolated island.

Fourteen species of birds nest annually on the island.  These include the horned lark, orange-crowned warbler, and house finch.  Other birds found on the island include the brown pelican, storm petrels, Scripps's murrelet, Guadalupe murrelet, and cormorants.  Sea lions, harbor seals, and northern elephant seals are found along the shoreline.

Flora
Santa Barbara Island live-forever (Dudleya traskiae) is a succulent plant endemic to the island. A variety of St. Catherine's lace buckwheat (Eriogonum giganteum), Eriogonum giganteum var. compactum or Santa Barbara Island buckwheat, is endemic to and particularly rare on Santa Barbara Island.

Appearances in popular culture

 California's Gold Episode 508

See also

 Flora of the Channel Islands of California
 List of islands of California

References

Channel Islands National Park
Islands of Southern California
Islands of the Channel Islands of California
Islands of Ventura County, California
Miocene volcanism
Volcanism of California
Miocene geology
Paleogene California
Uninhabited islands of California
Islands of California